Fingerprints Don't Lie is a 1951 American crime film directed by Sam Newfield and starring Richard Travis, Sheila Ryan and Margia Dean. It was released by the independent distributor Lippert Pictures. The film's sets were designed by the art director Harry Reif.

Synopsis
At the trial of the alleged killer of the city's mayor, fingerprint expert Jim Stover gives evidence that seems likely to seal his conviction and likely execution. Stover strongly believes that "fingerprints don't lie" but is given cause to doubt this after a conversation. With the assistance of the dead mayor's daughter Carolyn he starts his own investigation to see if the accused is being framed.

Cast

References

Bibliography
 Spicer, Andrew. Historical Dictionary of Film Noir. Scarecrow Press, 2010.

External links

Fingerprints Don't Lie at TCMDB

1951 films
American crime drama films
1950s English-language films
Lippert Pictures films
1950s thriller films
American black-and-white films
Films directed by Sam Newfield
1950s American films